War on Everybody is the fourth album by God Bullies, released in 1991 through Amphetamine Reptile Records.

Track listing

Personnel 
God Bullies
Mike Hard – vocals
David B. Livingstone – guitar, synthesizer, sampler, tape, engineering, mixing
Tony Oliveri – drums
Eric Polcyn – bass guitar
Production and additional personnel
Adam Berg – drums on "Senojmot"
Mike Corso – keyboards on "Senojmot"
Bruce White – vocals on "Book Report Time"

References

External links 
 

1991 albums
Amphetamine Reptile Records albums
God Bullies albums